Lewis Ayres, a lay Catholic theologian, is Professor of Catholic and Historical Theology at Durham University in the United Kingdom.  Between 2009 and 2013 he served as the inaugural holder of the Bede Chair of Catholic Theology at Durham.

Biography 

Lewis Ayres was born and educated in the UK, completing his M.A. at the University of St. Andrews (1988) and his D.Phil. at Merton College, Oxford University (1994). He has taught in the UK, in Ireland at Trinity College Dublin and in the United States at Duke University and Emory University.

Research 

The core of his research has been Trinitarian theology in Augustine and in the Greek writers of the 4th century.  Ayres's period of research into patristic pneumatology has resulted in a collaborative translation of patristic texts on the Holy Spirit, but as yet the much anticipated monograph on the subject has not appeared. Besides Trinitarian theology in this pivotal period he is also interested in the later development of Trinitarian theology and in the place of Scripture in Early Christianity – both the history of Christian reading practices from the late 2nd century and the history of what can be termed the theology of Scripture itself.  He is at present writing a monograph that will concern the shifts in Patristic exegesis between AD 150 and 250. It is provisionally entitled As It Is Written: Ancient Literary Criticism and the Rise of Scripture AD 100-250.

Ayres claims "a number of interests in modern Catholic fundamental and dogmatic theology – as will be evident from the last chapter of Nicaea and some of the articles I have published." That chapter of Ayres's book was subject to sustained critical attention by Maurice Wiles, in the latter's review of the book (Journal of Theological Studies 56.2 (2005): 670–675). Wiles's sharpest criticism is that Ayres fails to show that his approach "is compatible with modern changes in our understanding of the scriptural grounds of the doctrine [sc., of the Trinity] and its development in the early patristic period." With reference to two specific examples, Wiles characterises Ayres's 'way of reading  the scriptural text' as 'forced and unconvincing'. Wiles connected these interpretive practices with Ayres's underlying conception of the Church.

Ayres also declares strong interest in the place of Scripture (and Tradition) in modern Catholic theology and the fundamental structure of Catholic theology. He is convinced that the ideological and professional divisions that have arisen between Scripture scholars, "systematic" and "historical" theologians have served Catholic theology ill.  He believes that ressourcement theologians have offered us many resources that can move us beyond these divisions, but much further work is necessary for their agenda to be taken forward.  In the hopes of contributing to this debate he is working on a book for Blackwells entitled Resting in the Word.  With his wife, Medi Ann Volpe (PhD: Duke University, 2006), he co-edited the Oxford Handbook of Catholic Theology.  He has co-edited the Blackwells series Challenges in Contemporary Theology for the past 18 years. He also serves on the editorial boards of the Journal of Early Christian Studies, Modern Theology and Augustinian Studies.

Collaboration with Michel Barnes 

Together with Michel Barnes, Associate Professor of Theology at Marquette University, Rowan Williams, and several others, Ayres is part of a rereading of Augustine's trinitarian theology that breaks with the older neoplatonic-centered account. In his 2007 doctoral dissertation, Keith Edward Johnson referred to this new reading as "New Canon" Augustine scholarship. From a footnote in Johnson's dissertation (p. 108 n. 189), that name would appear to have been taken from a publication by Barnes; however, the bibliography does not provide further details. The basis of the New Canon reading of Augustine was worked out in the years 1995–2000, during which Ayres and Barnes conducted an almost daily common reading and discussion, via e-mail, of Augustine's trinitarian writings.

The mutuality of Barnes' and Ayres' partnership is evident from the following comments in their respective papers, "Remember you are Catholic" and "Rereading Augustine on the Trinity":

Main publications

Nicaea and Its Legacy: An Approach to Trinitarian Theology (Oxford, 2004/6).
Ed. (With Frances Young and Andrew Louth) The Cambridge History of Early Christian Literature (Cambridge, 2004).
Augustine and the Trinity (Cambridge, 2010).
(with Andrew Radde-Gallwitz and Mark DelCogliano) Works on the Spirit: Athanasius and Didymus the Blind (Crestwood NY, 2012).

References

Academics of Durham University
Duke University faculty
Emory University faculty
Living people
Academics of Trinity College Dublin
21st-century British Roman Catholic theologians
Year of birth missing (living people)
Alumni of Merton College, Oxford
Alumni of the University of St Andrews